Chenaran (also Romanized as Čenārān, Chanārān, Chinārān, and Cenârân) is a city and capital of Chenaran County, in Razavi Khorasan Province, Iran. At the 2006 census, its population was 41,735, in 10,179 families.

Chenaran is a touristic city.  The city of Chenaran is located under the bridge called Shiny Bridge. It is mostly famous for its tourist objectives. Tourists come to take a look at the city over the famous Shiny Bridge. The city favors from a mountainous weather plus rich wildlife

Geography 
Its climate is hot in summer and cold in winter. Also, its climate in spring is often very rainy and with strong winds and due to its relatively close distance to Mashhad, it is known as the summer resort of Mashhad.

Location 
Chenaran is located on the north axis to Mashhad metropolis and you can enter this city from road 22 or Asian highway. With the completion of the Mashhad-Golbahar- Chenaran subway and the completion of the Mashhad-Chennaran freeway, these three cities will be easier to access each other.

References 

Populated places in Chenaran County
Cities in Razavi Khorasan Province
Nishapur Quarter